Wildell is an unincorporated community in Pocahontas County, West Virginia, United States.

The community took its name from Willdell Lumber Company, which operated in the area.

References

Unincorporated communities in Pocahontas County, West Virginia
Unincorporated communities in West Virginia